The 1901 WAFA season was the 17th season of senior Australian rules football in Perth, Western Australia.

Ladder

References

West Australian Football League seasons
WAFL